Significant events that have occurred in 2018 in all fields of technology, including computing, robotics, electronics, as well as any other areas of technology as well, including any machines, devices, or other technological developments, occurrences, and items.

January 
1 January – Researchers at Harvard, writing in Nature Nanotechnology, report the first single lens that can focus all colours of the rainbow in the same spot and in high resolution, previously only achievable with multiple lenses.
2 January – Physicists at Cornell University report the creation of "muscle" for shape-changing, cell-sized robots.
3 January
Computer researchers report discovering two major security vulnerabilities, named "Meltdown" and "Spectre," in the microprocessors inside almost all computers in the world.
Scientists in Rome unveil the first bionic hand with a sense of touch that can be worn outside a laboratory.
4 January – MIT researchers devise a new method to create stronger and more resilient nanofibers.
15 January
Artificial intelligence programs developed by Microsoft and Alibaba achieve better average performance on a Stanford University reading and comprehension test than human beings.

October
11 October – The world's fastest camera, able to capture 10 trillion frames per second, is announced by the Institut national de la recherche scientifique (INRS) in Quebec, Canada.

References

Technology and computing
2018 in technology
Technology timelines by year